Grigoris Kastanos (born 30 January 1998) is a Cypriot professional footballer who plays as a midfielder for  club Salernitana and the Cyprus national team.

Club career
Kastanos was an Enosis Neon Paralimni youth player. In January 2014 he joined the Juventus academy.

On 25 November 2015, he scored both of the team's goals in a 2–1 win against Manchester City in the UEFA Youth League group stage.

On 20 January 2017, Kastanos joined Pescara on loan until the end of season.

On 13 April 2019, Kastanos made his Juventus debut in a 2–1 away loss against S.P.A.L. in Serie A.

On 22 August 2019, he returned to Pescara on another loan.

On 12 September 2020, Kastanos joined Serie B side Frosinone on loan until 30 June 2021.

On 14 August 2021, Kastanos joined Serie A side Salernitana on loan. On 2 August 2022, he returned to Salernitana on a permanent basis and signed a four-year contract with the club.

International career
In September 2013, Kastanos made three appearances for Cyprus at under-17 level.

He made his debut for the Cyprus national football team on 28 March 2015, replacing captain Konstantinos Makridis for the final six minutes of a 5–0 defeat to Belgium at the King Baudouin Stadium in Brussels, in UEFA Euro 2016 qualifying.

Career statistics

International
Scores and results list Cyprus' goal tally first, score column indicates score after each Kastanos goal.

References

External links

 
 
 

Living people
1998 births
Cypriot footballers
Cyprus international footballers
Cyprus youth international footballers
Association football midfielders
Greek Cypriot people
Belgian Pro League players
Serie A players
Serie B players
Serie C players
Juventus F.C. players
Juventus Next Gen players
Delfino Pescara 1936 players
Frosinone Calcio players
U.S. Salernitana 1919 players
S.V. Zulte Waregem players
Cypriot expatriate footballers
Cypriot expatriate sportspeople in Belgium
Expatriate footballers in Belgium
Cypriot expatriate sportspeople in Italy
Expatriate footballers in Italy